The 2007–08 Western Football League season (known as the 2007–08 Toolstation Western Football League for sponsorship reasons) was the 106th in the history of the Western Football League, a football competition in England. Teams were divided into two divisions; the Premier and the First.

The league champions for the first time in their history were Truro City, who were promoted to the Southern League. The champions of Division One were Wellington.

Premier Division
The Premier Division featured two new clubs in a league of 21, reduced from 22 the previous season after the promotion of Bridgwater Town to the Southern League, the relegation of Keynsham Town to the First Division, and the resignation of Torrington, who joined the North Devon League.

Ilfracombe Town, third in the First Division.
Truro City, champions of the First Division.

Final table

First Division
The First Division featured three new clubs in a league of 21, reduced from 22 the previous season after Truro City and Ilfracombe Town were promoted to the Premier Division, Biddestone resigned and Clyst Rovers transferred to the South West Peninsula League.

Keynsham Town, relegated from the Premier Division.
Oldland Abbotonians, promoted as third-place finishers in the Somerset County League.
Roman Glass St George, promoted as champions of the Gloucestershire County League.

Final table

References
 League tables

External links
 Western League Official Site

2007-08
9